The Wild Heart is the second solo studio album by American singer and songwriter Stevie Nicks. Recording began in late 1982, shortly after the end of Fleetwood Mac's Mirage Tour. After the death of her best friend, Robin Anderson, and with new appreciation for her life and career, Nicks recorded the album in only a few months and was released on June 10, 1983, a year after Fleetwood Mac's Mirage album. It peaked at number five on the US Billboard 200 (for seven consecutive weeks) and achieved platinum status on September 12, 1983. The album has shipped 2 million copies in the US alone.

The album is notable for its array of prominent guest musicians. Tom Petty made a return to write "I Will Run to You", on which his bandmates from The Heartbreakers performed. Nicks' Fleetwood Mac bandmate, Mick Fleetwood, made an appearance on the track "Sable on Blonde". Toto's Steve Lukather contributed some of the guitar work on what would become the album's biggest hit single, "Stand Back", which also features an uncredited contribution from Prince, who played the synthesizer track. Nicks also worked with friend Sandy Stewart, who wrote the music for three tracks on the album and performed on several (Stewart would go on to write the 1987 Fleetwood Mac hit "Seven Wonders"). The album's final track, "Beauty and the Beast", features a full string section performing a score arranged and conducted by Paul Buckmaster. Nicks had recorded various other tracks prior to the album's release, including "Violet and Blue" which was featured on the movie soundtrack for Against All Odds, and later on Nicks' 3-disc retrospective box set Enchanted in 1998.

The Wild Heart was certified double platinum by the Recording Industry Association of America (RIAA) in 1993, ten years after its release, denoting shipments in excess of two million copies in the United States. It spent a whole year on the Billboard 200 from June 1983 to June 1984. It has also been certified silver by the British Phonographic Industry (BPI) for shipments in excess of 60,000 in the United Kingdom. Three singles were released from the album: "Stand Back", which charted at number five; "If Anyone Falls", which charted at number 14; and "Nightbird", which charted at number 33. "Stand Back" and "If Anyone Falls" featured accompanying music videos that went into heavy rotation on MTV. "Nightbird", a track that Nicks has said was her favorite on the album, was performed live on Solid Gold and Saturday Night Live.

Track listing

The Wild Heart: Deluxe Edition (Rhino, 2016)

Personnel 
 Stevie Nicks – lead and backing vocals
 Sandy Stewart – synthesizers (1, 3, 5, 6, 8, 9), keyboards (3), acoustic piano solo (5), lead vocals (5), additional backing vocals (5)
 Roy Bittan – synthesizers (2), acoustic piano (4, 8, 9, 10)
 Benmont Tench – organ (3, 4, 5), keyboards (7)
 David Foster – acoustic piano (5)
 David Bluefield – Oberheim OB-Xa programming (6), Oberheim DMX drum machine (6)
 Prince – synthesizers (6, uncredited)
 David Monday – guitars (1, 3)
 Dean Parks – guitars (1)
 Waddy Wachtel – guitars (2-6, 9)
 Steve Lukather – guitars (6)
 David Williams – guitars (6)
 Mike Campbell – guitars (7)
 Tom Petty – guitars (7), lead and backing vocals (7)
 Don Felder – guitars (8)
 Roger Tausz – bass (1)
 Bob Glaub – bass (2, 4, 8)
 Kenny Edwards – bass (5, 9)
 Howie Epstein – bass (7)
 John Beal – bass (10)
 Brad Smith – drums (1, 3), percussion (3)
 Russ Kunkel – drums (2, 4, 8), drum overdubs (6)
 Marvin Caruso – drums (5, 6)
 Chet McCracken – drum overdubs (5)
 Stan Lynch – drums (7)
 Mick Fleetwood – drums (9)
 Bobbye Hall – percussion (2, 4, 6, 8)
 Ian Wallace – percussion (6)
 Phil Kenzie – saxophone (8)
 Sharon Celani – backing vocals
 Lori Perry-Nicks – backing vocals
 Carolyn Brooks – backing vocals (2, 10)

String section on "Beauty and the Beast"
 Paul Buckmaster – string arrangements and conductor 
 Kenneth Whitfield – string arrangements
 Jon Abramowitz, Seymour Barab, Jesse Levy and Frederick Zlotkin – cello
 Gene Bianco – harp
 Julien Barber, Theodore Israel, Jesse Levine and Harry Zaratzian – viola
 Harry Cykman, Peter Dimitriades, Regis Eandiorio, Lewis Eley, Max Ellen, Paul Gershman, Harry Glickman, Raymond Kunicki, Marvin Morgenstern, John Pintavalle, Matthew Raimondi, Herbert Sorkin, Ruth Waterman and Paul Winter – violin

Production 
 Jimmy Iovine – producer 
 Gordon Perry – producer (1, 3)
 Tom Petty – producer (7)
 Shelly Yakus – engineer, mixing (2, 4–10)
 Lori Perry-Nicks – mixing (1, 3), handtinting
 Greg Edwards – additional engineer, mixing (2, 4–10)
 Tom "Gordo" Gondolf – additional engineer (1, 3)
 Josh Abbey – assistant engineer 
 David Bianco – assistant engineer
 Michael Brooks – assistant engineer
 Bobby Cohen – assistant engineer
 John Curcio – assistant engineer
 Bill Freesh – assistant engineer
 Pete Kudas – assistant engineer
 John Smith – assistant engineer
 Julian Stoll – assistant engineer
 Stephen Marcussen – mastering
 Janet Weber – production coordinator 
 Rebecca Alvarez – personal assistant 
 Herbert W. Worthington – art direction, design, album cover concept, photography 
 Michael Curtis – layout design 
 Stevie Nicks – album cover concept, handtinting
 Michael Manoogian – logo design 
 Robert Alfrod – photography assistant 
 Michael Marks – photography assistant 
 Front Line Management – management 
 Sulamith Wulfing – album cover inspiration
 Herbert W. Worthington,

Studios
 Recorded at Goodnight Dallas (Dallas, Texas); Record Plant and Studio 55 (Los Angeles, California); A&M Studios (Hollywood, California); Record Plant and The Hit Factory (New York City, New York).
 Mixed at Rumbo Recorders (Los Angeles, California) and The Hit Factory.
 Mastered at Precision Lacquer (Hollywood, California).

Tour

Nicks went on a national tour in support of The Wild Heart. After headlining the massive US Festival on May 30, 1983, in San Bernardino, California, the tour officially started in Knoxville, Tennessee, on June 21, 1983, and ended in Ames, Iowa, on November 20, 1983.

Setlist
"Gold Dust Woman"
"Outside the Rain"
"Dreams"
"Gold and Braid" (see notes below)
"I Need to Know"
"Sara"
"Angel" (see notes below)
"Enchanted" (see notes below)
"If Anyone Falls"
"Leather and Lace"
"Stand Back"
"Beauty and the Beast"
"Gypsy"
"How Still My Love"
"I Will Run to You" (see notes below)
"Stop Draggin' My Heart Around"
"Edge of Seventeen"
Encore
"Rhiannon"

Notes
"Enchanted" was performed only at the Meadowlands Arena in East Rutherford, New Jersey, on June 24, 1983.
"Angel" and "Gold and Braid" were performed only on the opening night at the US Festival.
"I Will Run to You" was performed at Radio City Music Hall in New York City with Tom Petty.

Dates
May 30 -  San Bernardino, California, Devore Park/US Festival II
June 21 - Knoxville, Tennessee, Civic Coliseum
June 23 - Norfolk, Virginia, The Scope
June 24 - East Rutherford, New Jersey, Meadowlands Arena
June 27 - Philadelphia, Pennsylvania, The Spectrum
June 28 - Pittsburgh, Pennsylvania, Civic Arena
July 2 - Buffalo, New York, War Memorial
July 3 - Hartford, Connecticut, Hartford Civic Center
July 6 - Worcester, Massachusetts, Centrum
July 7 - Landover, Maryland, Capitol Center
July 10 - Greensboro, North Carolina, Coliseum
July 11 - Atlanta, Georgia, The Omni
July 14 - Kansas City, Missouri, Kemper Arena
July 15 - Minneapolis, Minnesota, Met Center
July 17 - Chicago, Illinois Rosemont, Horizon
July 18 - Chicago, Illinois Rosemont, Horizon
July 19 - Toronto, Ontario, Canada CNE, Bandshell
July 21 - Cuyahoga Falls, Ohio Blossom, Music Center
July 22 - Cuyahoga Falls, Ohio Blossom, Music Center
July 23 - Detroit, Michigan, Joe Louis Arena
July 26 - St. Louis, Missouri, Checkerdome
July 27 - Indianapolis, Indiana, Market Square Arena
July 30 - Alpine Valley, Wisconsin, Music Theatre
July 31 - Cincinnati, Ohio, Riverfront Coliseum
August 31 - Austin, Texas, Frank Erwin Center
September 5 - Dallas, Texas, Reunion Arena
September 9 - Bristol, Rhode Island, Colt State Park
September 12 - New York, Radio City Music Hall
September 13 - New York, Radio City Music Hall
September 17 - Oklahoma City, Oklahoma, Oklahoma Myriad
September 24 - Irvine, California, Irvine Meadows Amphitheatre
September 25 - Tempe, Arizona, Compton Terrace
October 2 - Los Angeles, California, Inglewood Forum
October 4 - Oakland, California, Oakland Coliseum
October 21 - Columbia, South Carolina, Carolina Coliseum
October 22 - Columbia, South Carolina, Carolina Coliseum
October 25 - Charleston, West Virginia, Charleston Civic Center
October 26 - Roanoke, Virginia, Roanoke Civic Center
October 29 - Tuscaloosa, Alabama, University of Alabama
October 30 - Jackson, Mississippi, Mississippi Coliseum
November 2 - Jacksonville, Florida, Memorial Coliseum
November 4 - Lakeland, Florida, Lakeland Civic Center
November 5 - Miami, Florida, Sportatorium
November 8 - Columbia, Missouri, University of Missouri
November 9 - Starkville, Mississippi, Mississippi State University
November 12 - Tulsa, Oklahoma, Assembly Center
November 13 - Little Rock, Arkansas, T.H. Barton Coliseum
November 16 - Madison, Wisconsin, Dane County Arena
November 19 - Iowa City, Iowa, University of Iowa
November 20 - Ames, Iowa, Iowa State University
November 23 - Charlotte, North Carolina, Charlotte Coliseum
November 24 - Columbia, South Carolina, Carolina Coliseum

Charts

Weekly charts

Year-end charts

Certifications

References

Bibliography

 

1983 albums
Stevie Nicks albums
Albums produced by Jimmy Iovine
Albums arranged by Paul Buckmaster
Albums produced by Tom Petty
Modern Records (1980) albums